The Ranchhodlal Baronetcy (also spelt Runchorelal), of Shahpur in Ahmedabad in India, is a title in the Baronetage of the United Kingdom. It was created on 6 February 1913 for Sir Chinubhai Madhowlal Ranchhodlal, Kt., CIE, son of Madhavlal Rachhodlal (died 4 April 1900), a cotton manufacturer of Ahmedabad who also contributed to various education schemes in India. He was the first Hindu to be created a baronet.

Ranchhodlal baronets, of Shahpur (1913)
Sir Chinubhai Madhowlal Ranchhodlal, 1st Baronet (1864–1916)
Sir (Girijaprasad) Chinubhai Madhowlal Ranchhodlal, 2nd Baronet (1906–1990)
Sir (Udayan) Chinubhai Madhowlal Ranchhodlal, 3rd Baronet (1929–2006)
Sir (Prashant) Chinubhai Madhowlal Ranchhodlal, 4th Baronet (born 1955).

The heir presumptive is the present baronet's uncle Kirtidev Chinubhai Ranchhodlal (born 1932).

Coat of arms

Ranchhodlal's status during the British Rule

Ranchhodlal Chhotalal (1823–1898) was the pioneer of cotton textile mills in Gujarat. In 1861, he founded the first cotton textile mill in Gujarat and the second in India. He named it The Ahmedabad Spinning and Weaving Company Ltd. He became the first Indian to be the president of the Ahmedabad Municipality in 1888. He was given the title of "Rao Bahadur". His grandson, Chinubhai (1864–1916), introduced the drainage system in Ahmedabad and was created a Baronet. Mahatma Gandhi used to come to Sir Chinubhai for his wise advice. He was a charitable man with a strong character. There is a large statue of Sir Chinubhai in Bhadra, Ahmedabad, India.

See also
Ranchhodlal Chhotalal

References

Ranchhodlal
Indian baronets
1913 establishments in the United Kingdom